Zdzisław Konieczny (1930 - 25 November 2016) was a Polish historian specializing in the issue of Polish-Ukrainian relations. He was a member of the Polish Historical Society. He was the director of the Municipal archive in Przemyśl from 1976 to 1996.

Selected publications
An Outline of History of Przemyśl Archive and its Resources (1874-1987), Przemyśl 1988 
Documents About Polish-Ukrainian Relationship in Resources of the State Archive in Przemyśl
Office Apartments and Buildings of Przemyśl Archive, Przemyśl 1996 
The Diploma of Emperor Joseph II from 1789 Restoring the Local Power to Przemyśl, Przemyśl 1990 
Ukrainian Organisations in the Light of Report of the Starosts from 1939
Resources for the History of the Peasant Movement in the State Archive in Przemyśl
"Był taki czas. U źródeł akcji odwetowej w Pawłokomie". Przemyśl 2000. wyd. Archiwum Państwowego w Przemyślu
Kazimierz Karol Arłamowski, Przemyśl 1982 
Influence of October Revolution over an Increase of Revolutionary Movements in Przemyśl (Lecture), Przemyśl 1977 
Tadeusz Troskolański, Przemyśl 1981 
"Walki polsko-ukraińskie w Przemyślu i okolicy listopad-grudzień 1918" - Przemyśl 1993
"Rozwój i działalność PPR na terenie miasta i powiatu przemyskiego w latach 1944-1948" - (w:) Przemyskie Zapiski Historyczne z 1974
Źródła do dziejów ziem województwa tarnobrzeskiego w zasobie Archiwum Państwowego w Przemyślu
Sprawozdanie Archiwum Państwowego w Przemyślu za lata 1993–1995; Recenzje i omówienia
Żydzi w świetle sprawozdań starostów z lat 1938–1939: [źródła]
Zmiany demograficzne w południowo - wschodniej Polsce w latach 1939 - 1950, Przemyśl 2002 
Przywilej lokacyjny miasta Przeworska z 1393 roku, Przemyśl 1992
Akta dotyczące stosunków polsko-ukraińskich w zasobie Archiwum Państwowego w Przemyślu;
Zdzisław Konieczny.  Okupacyjny spis ludności z 1 marca 1943 roku w 11 powiatach południowo-wschodnich dystryktów lubelskiego i krakowskiego Generalnego Gubernatorstwa
Materiały źródłowe do dziejów ruchu ludowego w zasobie Archiwum Państwowego w Przemyślu;
Gimnazjum i Liceum w Przeworsku w latach 1911–1991. Zarys dziejów, Przeworsk 1992 
Walki polsko - ukrainskie w Przemyślu i okolicy - listopad, grudzień 1918 r.,

References

External links
Municipal archive in Przemyśl. "Our History"
 Pawłokoma: niech przemówi historia, a nie polityka (interview with Zbigniew Konieczny), Nasz Dziennik, 2006-05-10

1930 births
2016 deaths
20th-century Polish historians
Polish male non-fiction writers
Historians of Poland
Historians of Ukraine